A list of law schools in India.

Andhra Pradesh

1 Acharya Nagarjuna University, Nagarjun NagarGuntur
2 A.C. Andhra Christian College, Guntur
3 All Saints Christian Law College, Visakhapatnam
4 Andhra University College of Law, of Andhra University, Waltair, Visakhapatnam
5 Anantha College of Law, Tirupati
 Anantapur Law College, Anantapur
 A.V.R. Amrutha College of Law, Visakhapatnam
 Bapatla Education Society’s Law College, Bapatla
 C.R.R. Law College, Eluru
 Dr Ambedkar Global Law Institute, Tirupati, Old name Dr. B. R. Ambedkar Law College
 Dr Ambedkar Global Law Institute, Tirupati, Old name Dr. B. R. Ambedkar Law College
 Dr. B.R. Ambedkar P.G. Centre, Etcherla, Srikakulam]]
 Daita Sriramulu Hindu College of Law, Machilipatnam
 Damodaram Sanjivayya National Law University, Visakhapatnam
 D.N. Raju Law College, Bhimavaram
 D.S.R. Hindu Law College, Machilipatnam
 Gitam School of Law, of GITAM University, Visakhapatnam
 G.S.K.M. Law College, Rajahmundry
 Indira Priyadarshini Law College, Ongole
 JC College of Law, Guntur
 KKC College of Law, Chittoor
 K.L.U. College of Law, Green Fields of Vaddeshwaram University of Guntur
 M.M. College of Law, Vijayawada
 M.P.R. Law College, Srikakulam
 M.R.V.R.G.R Law College, Viziayanagaram
 N.B.M. Law College, Visakhapatnam
 NVP Law College, Visakhapatnam
 Osmania Law College, Kurnool
 PS Raju Law College, Kakinada
 Rajiv Gandhi Institute of Law, Kakinada
 Sri R.K.M. Law College, Chittoor
 Shri Shiridi Sai Vidya Parishad Law College, Amalapuram
 Shri Shiridi Sai Vidya Parishad Law College, Anakapalli
 Smt. Basava Rama Tarakam Memorial Law College, Cuddapah
 Smt Velagapudi Durgamba Siddhartha Law College, Vijayawada
 Sree Vijaya Nagar Law College, Anantapur
 Sri Eshwar Reddy College of Law, Tirupati
 Sri P. Basi Reddy College of Law, Cuddapah
 Sri Prasunna College of Law, Kurnool
 Sri Sankara’s Law College, Kurnool
 Sri Venkateswara College of Law, Tirupati
 Sri Venkateshwara University, Tirupati
 Sri Krishnadevaraya University of Anantapur
 Sri Padmavati Mahila Viswavidyalayam of Tirupati
 Sri Venkateswara University of Tirupati
 University Law College, Waltair (Dr. B.R. Ambedkar College of Law)
 University College of Law, A. Nagarjuna
 Veeravalli College of Law, Rajahmundhry
 Vikramasimhapuri University of Nellore
 Visakha Law College, Visakhapatnam
 V.R. Law College, Nellore
 Yogi Vemana University, Kadapa
 Ns Law college devaraju gattu village near markapur

Arunachal Pradesh
Jarbom Gamlin Government Law College

Assam
National Law University and Judicial Academy, Assam
JB Law College, Guwahati
University Law College, Guwahati University
NEF Law College, Guwahati
Dispur Law College, Guwahati
Jorhat Law College, Jorhat
Tezpur Law College, Tezpur
BRM Government Law College, Guwahati
Dhubri Law College, Dhubri
Nowgong Law College, Nowgong
Diphu Law College, Diphu
Assam University, Silchar
A. K. Chanda Law College, Silchar
Karimganj Law College, Karimganj
Dr. R. K. B. Law College, Dibrugarh
IIPA Law Institute, Dibrugarh
D.H.S.K. Law College, Dibrugarh
S.I.P.E. Law College, Dibrugarh
Morigaon Law College, Morigaon
Royal School of Law and Administration, Guwahati
Bongaigaon Law College, Bongaigaon

Bihar
 Chanakya National Law University, Patna
 Central University of South Bihar, Gaya
 Anugrah Memorial Law college, Gaya
 Biswanath Singh Institute of Legal Studies, Munger
 Bihar Institute of Law, Patna
 Biraja Mohan Thakur Law College, Purnia
 R. M. M. Law College, Saharsa
 Mahadeo Singh Law College, Bhagalpur
 Suryadeo Law College, Katihar
 S.K.J. Law College, Muzaffarpur
 Patna Law College, Patna
 Bidheh Law College, Madhubani
 Samastipur Law College, Samastipur

Chhattisgarh
MATS Law School, MATS University, Raipur
Department of Law, Guru Ghasidas Vishwavidyalaya, Bilaspur
Faculty of Law, Dr. C. V. Raman University
Faculty of Law, Kalinga University, Raipur
Hidyatullah National Law University, Raipur
Jyoti Bhushan Pratap Singh Law College, Korba
School of Law, ISBM University
School of Law, ITM University, Raipur
School of Studies in Law, Pandit Ravishankar Shukla University, Raipur

Delhi
University School of Law and Legal Studies, constituent law college of Guru Gobind Singh Indraprastha University, Delhi. Established in 2001
National Law University, Delhi Established in 2008
Amity Law School, New Delhi (affiliated to Guru Gobind Singh Indraprastha University)
Faculty of Law, University of Delhi, New Delhi, with three centres: Campus Law Centre, Law Centre I and Law Centre II
Indian Law Institute, New Delhi
Vivekananda Institute of Professional Studies, New Delhi (affiliated to Guru Gobind Singh Indraprastha University)
Faculty of Law, Jamia Millia Islamia, New Delhi
Gitarattan International Business School, New Delhi (affiliated to Guru Gobind Singh Indraprastha University)
Trinity Institute of Professional Studies (TIPS), New Delhi (affiliated to Guru Gobind Singh Indraprastha University)

Goa
Govind Ramnath Kare College of Law, Margao (affiliated to Goa University)
 V. M. Salgaocar College of Law, Panji

Gujarat
Auro University, Surat
Gujarat Law Society,  Ahmedabad https://www.glsuniversity.ac.in/
Baroda School of Legal Studies, Faculty of Law, Maharaja Sayajirao University of Baroda, Vadodara
Gujarat National Law University, Gandhinagar
School of Law Forensic Justice & Policy Studies, National Forensic Sciences University, Gandhinagar
Nirma University, Ahmedabad
Unitedworld School of Law, Gandhinagar
Department of Law, Veer Narmad South Gujarat University, Surat

Haryana

 KR Mangalam University
 Jagan Nath University, NCR Bahadurgarh
Jindal Global Law School, Jindal Global University, Sonipat, Haryana
Smt. Shanti Devi Law College, Rewari, affiliated with Maharshi Dayanand University
 Baba Mast Nath University, in Asthal Bohar, Rohtak
 Kurushetra University
 Maharishi Dayanand University Rohtak
Dr. B.R. Ambedkar National Law University
 MDU Center for Professional and Allied Studies, GurugramI
 GD Goenka University

Himachal Pradesh 

 Faculty of Law, Himachal Pradesh University, Shimla
Himachal Pradesh National Law University, Shimla

Jammu And Kashmir
School of Legal Studies, Central University of Kashmir.
Vitasta School of Law and Humanities, Srinagar, Kashmir
Deptt. of Law, Kashmir University, Srinagar
Sopore Law College, Sopore
Kashmir Law College, Srinagar
K. C. Education Foundation’s Law College, Pulwama-Kashmir
Department of Law, University of Jammu
Dogra Law College, Jammu
Kishen Chand Law College, Jammu
C. M. H. College of Legal Studies, Jammu 
Jammu Law College, Jammu
Ashoka Law College, Kathuva 
Calliope School of Legal Studies, Jammu 
S. E. T. Law School, Bari Brahmana, Jammu
Bhargava Law College, Samba
Law School, Jammu University, Jammu
R. K. Law College, Bari Brahmana, Jammu

Jharkhand
National University of Study and Research in Law, Ranchi
Chotanagpur Law College, Ranchi University, Ranchi
Jharkhand Vidhi Mahavidyalaya, Kodarma
Radha Govind Law College, Ramgarh
Imamul Hai Khan Law College, Bokaro Steel City
Law College Dhanbad, Dhanbad
Bhishma Narain Singh Law College, Palamu

Karnataka
Alliance School of Law, Bangalore
CMR Law School, Bangalore
KLE Law College - offers LLB, BA.LLB and BBA. LLB (accredited to Karnataka State Law University, Hubali and recognised by Bar Council of India)
M. S. Ramaiah College of Law, Bangalore (affiliated to Karnataka State Law University)
National Law School of India University, Bangalore
Al-Ameen College of Law, Hosur Road, Bangalore
CBR National College Of Law, Shivamogga (Affiliated to Karnataka State Law University)
Kristu Jayanti College of Law, Bengaluru [Affiliated to Karnataka State Law University
School of Law, Presidency University, Bangalore
Raja Lakhamgouda Law College, Belgaum
School of Law, Christ University, Bangalore
Sri Dharmasthala Manjunatheswara Law College and Centre for Post Graduate Studies in Law, Mangalore (affiliated to Karnataka State Law University)
G.K Law College, Hubli(Affiliated to Karnataka State Law University)
University Law College, Bangalore University, Bangalore

Kerala
Government Law College Calicut, under Calicut University
Government Law College, Ernakulam, Kochi, under Mahatma Gandhi University, Kottayam
Government Law College, Thiruvananthapuram, under Kerala University, Thiruvananthapuram
Government Law College, Thrissur, under Calicut University, Calicut
Mar Gregorios College of Law, Thiruvananthapuram (affiliated to Kerala University)
Kerala Law Academy Law College, Thiruvananthapuram (affiliated to Kerala University)
Markaz Law College, under Calicut University, Thenjippalam
MMNSS College Kottiyam, Kollam (affiliated to Kerala University)
National University of Advanced Legal Studies, Kochi
School of Legal Studies, CUSAT, Kochi
Sree Narayana Guru College of Legal Studies, Kollam (affiliated to Kerala University)
Bharata Mata School of Legal Studies (BSOLS), Aluva

Madhya Pradesh
Shri Vaishnav Institute of Law, Indore
Jagran Lakecity University, School of Law, Bhopal
National Law Institute University, Bhopal
Dharmashastra National Law University, Jabalpur

Maharashtra
A.K.K. New Law Academy, Pune, affiliated to Savitribai Phule Pune University, Pune
Government Law College, Mumbai, affiliated to University of Mumbai
RTMNU's Dr. Ambedkar College of Law, Main Branch, Nagpur
Maharashtra National Law University, Mumbai
Maharashtra National Law University, Nagpur
Maharashtra National Law University, Aurangabad
School of Law, University of Mumbai
Shahaji Law College, Kolhapur est. in 1933, affiliated to Shivaji University, Kolhapur
Siddharth College of Law, Mumbai, affiliated to University of Mumbai
ILS Law College, Pune, affiliated to University of Pune
New Law College, Pune, constituent of Bharati Vidyapeeth
Symbiosis Law School, Pune, constituent of Symbiosis International University
GJ Advani Law College, affiliated to University of Mumbai
Rizvi Law College, affiliated to University of Mumbai
New Law College, Mumbai, affiliated to University of Mumbai

Manipur
L.M.S. Law College, Imphal

Mizoram
Mizoram Law College, Aizawl

Meghalaya
Shillong Law College, Shillong
Tura Law College, Tura

Nagaland
Kohima Law College, Kohima

Odisha
KIIT Law School, KIIT Deemed University, Bhubaneswar
National Law University Odisha, Cuttack
Madhusudan Law College, Cuttack
Siksha 'O' Anusandhan Deemed University National School of Law, Bhubaneswar
Utkal University Law College, Bhubaneswar
Berhampur University PG Department of Law, Berhampur
Sambalpur University PG Department of Law, Sambalpur
North Odisha University PG Department of Law, Baripada
The Law College, Cuttack
Jeypore Law college, Jeypore
Xavier Law School, Xavier University, Bhubaneswar

Punjab

 St. Soldier law college, Jalandhar
 Army Institute of Law, Mohali
 Rajiv Gandhi National University of Law, Patiala
 Baba Kundan Singh Memorial Law College, Moga, Punjab
 Bhai Gurdas College of Law, Sangrur
 KCL Institute of Law, Jalandhar
 Baba Farid Law College, Faridkot
 Universal Law College, Mohali
 VMS College of Law, Batala
 Rayat College of Law, Railmajra
 Khalsa College of Law, Amritsar
 Bathinda College of Law, Bathinda
 Aryans College of Law, Patiala
 Bahra College of Law, Patiala

Rajasthan

University Five Year Law College, University Of Rajasthan, Jaipur 
Seedling School Of Law And Governance, Jaipur National University, Jaipur
National Law University, Jodhpur
Dr. Bhimrao Ambedkar Law University
Mody University of Science & Technology
Raffles University, Neemrana
MohanLal Sukhadiya University College of Law, Udaipur
RNB Global University

Sikkim 
 Sikkim University, Gangtok (established 2006)

Tamil Nadu
 Crescent School of Law, B.S. Abdur Rahman Crescent Institute of Science & Technology, Chennai (established 1984)https://crescent.education/
 Institute of Legal Education (ILE - Online Law School), Tiruchirappalli (established 2022)
Dr. Ambedkar Government Law College, Chennai (established 1891)
Government Law College, Coimbatore (established 1979)
Government Law College, Madurai (established 1979)
Government Law College, Tiruchirapalli (established 1979)
Central Law College, Salem, Salem (established 1984)
Government Law College, Chengalpattu (established 2002)
Government Law College, Tirunelveli (established 1996)
Government Law College, Vellore (established 2008)
Tamil Nadu National Law University, Tiruchirappalli (established 2012)
SASTRA University, School of Law, Thanjavur
VIT University, VIT Law School, Chennai
PRIST University, School of Law, Madurai (established 2015)
 School of Law, Sathyabama Institute of Science and Technology, chennai

Telangana

Nalsar University of Law, Hyderabad (established 1998)
Symbiosis Law School, Hyderabad
University College of Law, Osmania University, Hyderabad
Mahatma Gandhi Law College, near LB Nagar, Hyderabad
Keshav Memorial College of Law, Hyderabad
Pendekanti Law College, Hyderabad
Padala Rama Reddi Law College, Hyderabad
ICFAI Law School, Hyderabad
 Justice Kumarayya Law College, Karimnagar .

Tripura
Tripura Government Law College

Uttar Pradesh

kanpur university 
Asian Law College, Noida
School of Law, Justice & Governance, Gautam Buddha University, Greater Noida
Faculty of Law, University of Lucknow, Lucknow
Faculty of Law, Dr. Ram Manohar Lohia Awadh University, Faizabad
Faculty of Law, Banaras Hindu University, Varanasi
Faculty of Law, University of Allahabad
DME Law School (Affiliated to Guru Gobind Singh Indraprastha University)
Faculty of Law, Integral University, Lucknow
Symbiosis Law School, Noida (constituent college of Symbiosis International University)
Galgotias University, School of Law , Greater Noida.
Amity Law School, Noida (a constituent college of Amity University)
Dr. Ram Manohar Lohia National Law University, Lucknow
Faculty of Law, Aligarh Muslim University 
The Glocal University (Glocal School of Law), Saharanpur, Uttar Pradesh
Janhit College of Law, Greater Noida
Lloyd Law College, Greater Noida
Faculty of Law, Agra College
Chaudhary Charan Singh Vidhi Mahavidyalaya, Heonra (Saifai), Etawah district
SRMS college of law, Bareilly
AMROHA college of law, Amroha[Uttar pradesh]
Asian vidhi evam nyayik vigyan mahavidyalay, Nawabganj, Bareilly
PGS National College Of Law, Dr. Bhimrao Ambedkar University
Innovative Institute of Law, Greater Noida.
Lloyd Law College, Greater Noida

Uttarakhand
Graphic Era
 ICFAI Law School (ILS), Dehradun
 University of Petroleum and Energy Studies
 Law College, Dehradun
 Department of Law, Hemwati Nandan Bahuguna Garhwal University
 Department of Law, Kumaun University
 Siddhartha Law College, Dehradun
 Quantum University
Unity Law College(ULC),Kumaon

West Bengal
 Department of Law, University of Calcutta, Kolkata
 West Bengal National University of Juridical Sciences, Kolkata
 Bankura Samhati Law College (affiliated to Bankura University)
 Department of Law, Aliah University, Kolkata
 Haldia Law College, Haldia (affiliated to Vidyasagar University)
 South Calcutta Law College, Kolkata (affiliated to University of Calcutta)
 Hooghly Mohsin College, Hooghly (affiliated to University of Burdwan)
 Jogesh Chandra Chaudhuri Law College, Kolkata (affiliated to University of Calcutta)
 Midnapore Law College, Midnapore (affiliated to Vidyasagar University)
 Rajiv Gandhi School of Intellectual Property Law, Indian Institute of Technology, Kharagpur
 Surendranath Law College, Kolkata (affiliated to University of Calcutta)
 Indian Institute of Legal Studies
 Kingston Law College, Barasat (affiliated to West Bengal State University)
 Rabindra Shiksha Sammilani Law College, Baruipur (affiliated to University of Calcutta)
 LJD Law College Falta (affiliated to University of Calcutta)
 Snehangshu Kanta Acharya Institute of Law (affiliated to University of Kalyani)
 Mohammad Abdul Bari Institute of Juridical Science (affiliated to University of Kalyani)
 Law College Durgapur (affiliated to Kazi Nazrul University)
 Durgapur Institute of Legal Studies (affiliated to Kazi Nazrul University)
 Jalpaiguri Law College (affiliated to University of North Bengal)
 Balurghat Law College (affiliated to University of Gour Banga)

See also
 Institute of Legal Education (ILE - Online Law School), Tiruchirappalli (established 2022)
 Common Law Admission Test
 Legal education in India
 National Law Universities

References

India
 
Schools
Lists of universities and colleges in India